In chemistry, hydroxylation can refer to:
(i) most commonly, hydroxylation describes a chemical process that introduces a hydroxyl group into an organic compound. 
(ii) the degree of hydroxylation refers to the number of OH groups in a molecule. The pattern of hydroxylation refers to the location of hydroxy groups on a molecule or material.

Hydroxylation reactions

Synthetic hydroxylations
Installing hydroxyl groups into organic compounds can be effected by various metal catalysts.  Many such catalysts are biomimetic, i.e. they are inspired by or intended to mimic enzymes such as cytochrome P450.

Whereas many hydroxylations insert O atoms into  bonds, some reactions add OH groups to unsaturated substrates.  The Sharpless dihydroxylation is such a reaction: it converts alkenes into diols. The hydroxy groups are provided by hydrogen peroxide, which adds across the double bond of alkenes.

Biological hydroxylation
In biochemistry, hydroxylation reactions are often facilitated by enzymes called hydroxylases. A  bond is converted to an alcohol by insertion of an oxygen atom into a  bond. Typical stoichiometries for the hydroxylation of a generic hydrocarbon are these:
2R3C-H + O2 -> 2R3C-OH
R3C-H + O2 + 2e- + 2H+ -> R3C-OH + H2O
Since  itself is a slow and unselective hydroxylating agent, catalysts are required to accelerate the pace of the process and to introduce selectivity.

Hydroxylation is often the first step in the degradation of organic compounds in air.  Hydroxylation is important in detoxification since it converts lipophilic compounds into water-soluble (hydrophilic) products that are more readily removed by the kidneys or liver and excreted.  Some drugs (for example, steroids) are activated or deactivated by hydroxylation.

The principal hydroxylation agent in nature is cytochrome P-450, hundreds of variations of which are known. Other hydroxylating agents include flavins, alpha-ketoglutarate-dependent hydroxylases, and some diiron hydroxylases.

Of proteins
The hydroxylation of proteins occurs as a post-translational modification, and is catalyzed by 2-oxoglutarate-dependent dioxygenases. When molecules are hydroxylated, they become more water‐soluble, which affects their structure and function. It can take place on several amino acids, like lysine, asparagine, aspartate and histidine, but the most frequently hydroxylated amino acid residue in human proteins is proline. This is due to the fact that collagen makes up about 25–35% of the protein in our bodies and contains a hydroxyproline at almost every 3rd residue in its amino acid sequence. Collagen consists of both 3‐hydroxyproline and 4‐hydroxyproline residues. Hydroxylation occurs at the γ-C atom, forming hydroxyproline (Hyp), which stabilizes the secondary structure of collagen due to the strong electronegative effects of oxygen. Proline hydroxylation is also a vital component of hypoxia response via hypoxia inducible factors. In some cases, proline may be hydroxylated instead on its β-C atom. Lysine may also be hydroxylated on its δ-C atom, forming hydroxylysine (Hyl).

These three reactions are catalyzed by very large, multi-subunit enzymes prolyl 4-hydroxylase, prolyl 3-hydroxylase and lysyl 5-hydroxylase, respectively.  These reactions require iron (as well as molecular oxygen and α-ketoglutarate) to carry out the oxidation, and use ascorbic acid (vitamin C) to return the iron to its reduced state.  Deprivation of ascorbate leads to deficiencies in proline hydroxylation, which leads to less stable collagen, which can manifest itself as the disease scurvy. Since citrus fruits are rich in vitamin C, British sailors were given limes to combat scurvy on long ocean voyages; hence, they were called "limeys".

Several endogenous proteins contain hydroxyphenylalanine and hydroxytyrosine residues. These residues are formed due to the hydroxylation of phenylalanine and tyrosine, a process in which the hydroxylation converts phenylalanine residues into tyrosine residues. This is very important in living organisms to help them control excess amounts of phenylalanine residues. Hydroxylation of tyrosine residues is also very vital in living organisms because hydroxylation at C-3 of tyrosine creates 3,4- dihydroxy phenylalanine (DOPA), which is a precursor to hormones and can be converted into dopamine.

Examples
 17α-Hydroxylase
 Cholesterol 7 alpha-hydroxylase
 Dopamine β-hydroxylase
 Phenylalanine hydroxylase
 Tyrosine hydroxylase
 One example of non-biological hydroxylation is the hydrogen peroxide hydroxylation of phenol to form hydroquinone.

References

Organic redox reactions
Post-translational modification